The human β-globin locus is composed of five genes located on a short region of chromosome 11, responsible for the creation of the beta parts (roughly half) of the oxygen transport protein Haemoglobin. This locus contains not only the beta globin gene but also delta, gamma-A, gamma-G, and epsilon globin.  Expression of all of these genes is controlled by single locus control region (LCR), and the genes are differentially expressed throughout development.

The order of the genes in the beta-globin cluster is: 5' - epsilon – gamma-G – gamma-A – delta – beta - 3'.

The arrangement of the genes directly reflects the temporal differentiation of their expression during development, with the early-embryonic stage version of the gene located closest to the LCR. If the genes are rearranged, the gene products are expressed at improper stages of development.

Expression of these genes is regulated in embryonic erythropoiesis by many transcription factors, including KLF1, which is associated with the upregulation of adult hemoglobin in adult definitive erythrocytes, and KLF2, which is vital to the expression of embryonic hemoglobin.

HBB complex
Many CRMs have been mapped within the cluster of genes encoding β-like globins expressed in embryonic (HBE1), fetal (HBG1 and HBG2), and adult (HBB and HBD) erythroid cells. All are marked by DNase I hypersensitive sites and footprints, and many are bound by GATA1 in peripheral blood derived erythroblasts (PBDEs). A DNA segment located between the HBG1 and HBD genes is one of the DNA segments bound by BCL11A and several other proteins to negatively regulate HBG1 and HBG2. It is sensitive to DNase I but is not conserved across mammals. An enhancer located 3′ of the HBG1 gene is bound by several proteins in PBDEs and K562 cells and is sensitive to DNase I, but shows almost no signal for mammalian constraint.

References

Further reading 

 
 
 
 

Chromosomes
Hemoglobins